Looking Into Light is an album by Joanne Hogg. It was released in 1999, and reissued in 2006 as Celtic Hymns.

The idea for Looking Into Light came from Hogg's father who was struck by the "When I Survey the Wondrous Cross" recording by Iona. He made the suggestion that Hogg should record a complete album of hymns. Until the sudden death of her mother in February 1997, the idea was given little thought. The choice of songs and hymns came from those familiar to the family, and the album was put together over the next year or so.

The recordings were engineered by Nigel Palmer at the following studios:
The Snooker Room, Ireland
Gemini Studios, Ipswich
Visions Of Albion, Yorkshire
Rod's Cellar, Yorkshire

Personnel

Band
 Joanne Hogg – vocals, keyboard instruments
 Dave Bainbridge – keyboards, guitar, bouzouki
 Troy Donockley – Uillean pipes, low whistles
 Phil Barker – bass guitar
 Tim Harries – fuzz bass
 Frank van Essen – drum kit, percussion instruments, violin
 Dave Fitzgerald – flute, tin whistle
 Chris Redgate – oboe
 The Emperor String Quartet – strings
 Martin Burgess – 1st violin
 Claire Hayes – 2nd violin
 Fiona Bonds – viola
 William Schofield – cello
 Backing vocals on "Brightest and Best" – Hogg's sisters Helen, Doreen and Muriel

Track listing
"I Heard The Voice" – 3:59
"My Song Is Love Unknown" – 4:13
"How Sweet The Name" – 5:33
"Spacious Firmament" – 4:34
"Be Thou My Vision" – 6:20
"I Ask No Dream" – 5:23
"Oh The Deep, Deep Love" – 4:01
"Rock Of Ages" – 7:08
"Brightest And Best" – 3:54
"Almighty Father Who Dost Give" – 4:59
"When I Survey" – 6:30
"Be Still My Soul" – 3:27

Release details
1999, UK, Alliance Records 1901182, Release date : 15 November 1999, CD
1999, USA, Forefront Records FFD-5229, Release date : 15 November 1999, CD

1999 albums
Joanne Hogg albums